Erviti is a surname. Notable people with the surname include:

 Félix Erviti Barcelona (1910–2000), Spanish Roman Catholic priest
 Imanol Erviti (born 1983), Spanish road bicycle racer
 Walter Erviti (born 1980), Argentinian football player